Peter Woo Kwong-ching, GBM, GBS, JP (born September 5, 1946) is a Hong Kong billionaire businessman. He was the chairman of Wheelock and Company Limitedand The Wharf Holdings Limited until 19 May 2015. As of April 2021, his net worth is estimated to be $14 billion.

Education
Woo was born in Shanghai in 1946 with ancestral roots in Ningbo, Zhejiang, and moved to Hong Kong in 1949. He was educated at St Stephen's College, a Direct Subsidy Scheme privately owned but government-funded boarding school (which is also Hong Kong's largest secondary school), in the town of Stanley, and went on to attain his bachelor's degree from the University of Cincinnati, US, majoring in physics. While a student, Woo was senior class president, and became a member of Delta Tau Delta fraternity, an endeavor he is still involved in today. He later obtained an MBA from Columbia Business School in New York, US.

Life and career
After graduating, Woo worked at Chase Manhattan Bank in New York and Hong Kong, where he met his future wife Bessie. Bessie was the sister of the woman he was arranged to be married to. His family did not approve of a non Asian marriage.

Woo's diversified interests are reflected in his businesses, focusing in real estate development in Hong Kong, China and Singapore. The group owns several investment properties such as Harbour City and Times Square in Hong Kong, as well as operating other businesses such as i-Cable Communications, Wharf New T&T, Modern Terminals Limited and Marco Polo Hotels. Woo also owns the privately held, high-end luxury retail group LCJG, which includes Lane Crawford and the premier fashion house, Joyce. Woo also serves on the advisory board for various Fortune 500 companies such as Chase Manhattan Bank, JPMorgan Chase and General Electric.

Political and non-profit
Woo is a member of the Standing Committee of the Chinese People’s Political Consultative Conference.

His past appointments include:
 Chairman of the Council of the Hong Kong Polytechnic University from 1993 to 1997.
 Founding chairman of the Hong Kong Environment and Conservation Fund Committee in 1994 until 2004.
 Chairman of the Hong Kong Hospital Authority from 1995 to 2000.
 Chairman of the Hong Kong Trade Development Council from 2000 to 2007.

In 1996, Woo ran in the First Hong Kong Chief Executive Election just before the British colony was handed over back to Chinese rule, alongside Yang Ti-liang and Tung Chee-hwa. Tung won.

Achievements and honours
The Hong Kong SAR Government appointed Woo Justice of the Peace in 1993, awarded the Gold Bauhinia Star in 1998 and the Grand Bauhinia Medal in 2012.

See also
 Antony Leung
 Politics of Hong Kong
 Executive Council of Hong Kong

References

External links
 Peter Woo
 Wheelock
 Hong Kong Portraits of Power - Evelyn Huang and Lawrence Jeffrey, Little Brown 1995, p 102
Forbes List

1946 births
Living people
Businesspeople from Shanghai
Columbia Business School alumni
Hong Kong billionaires
Hong Kong chief executives
Members of the National Committee of the Chinese People's Political Consultative Conference
Hong Kong real estate businesspeople
People's Republic of China politicians from Shanghai
Recipients of the Gold Bauhinia Star
University of Cincinnati alumni
The Wharf (Holdings)
Wheelock and Company
Members of the Preparatory Committee for the Hong Kong Special Administrative Region
Hong Kong Basic Law Consultative Committee members
Hong Kong Affairs Advisors
Members of the Election Committee of Hong Kong, 2007–2012
Members of the Election Committee of Hong Kong, 2012–2017
Members of the Election Committee of Hong Kong, 2017–2021
Billionaires from Shanghai
Chinese emigrants to Hong Kong